William Ernest Reigel (May 3, 1932 – October 17, 1993) was an American basketball player and coach.  He played college basketball at Duke University and McNeese State University, leading McNeese to the 1956 NAIA championship.  Reigel went on to choose the Amateur Athletic Union over an offer from the NBA's Minneapolis Lakers.  He earned AAU All-American honors four times.

Following his playing days, he coached at the high school level and was head coach for his alma mater, McNeese State, for three seasons, compiling a record of 55–20.

He died on October 17, 1993.

References

External links

1932 births
1993 deaths
Amateur Athletic Union men's basketball players
American men's basketball coaches
American men's basketball players
Basketball coaches from Pennsylvania
Basketball players from Pennsylvania
College men's basketball head coaches in the United States
Duke Blue Devils men's basketball players
Duquesne University alumni
High school basketball coaches in the United States
McNeese Cowboys basketball coaches
McNeese Cowboys basketball players
People from Monaca, Pennsylvania
Sportspeople from the Pittsburgh metropolitan area
St. Louis Hawks draft picks
Guards (basketball)